Lietavská Lúčka is a village and municipality in Žilina District in the Žilina Region of northern Slovakia.

History
In historical records the village was first mentioned in 1393.

Geography
It has a population of about 1769 people. It has a large gender imbalance with women outnumbering men almost 2 to 1.

External links
https://web.archive.org/web/20070513023228/http://www.statistics.sk/mosmis/eng/run.html

Villages and municipalities in Žilina District